Officine Meccaniche Giovanni Cerutti S.p.A. is an Italian joint-stock company headquartered in Casale Monferrato, which designs and manufactures rotogravure and flexo printing presses and related equipment for magazine and newspaper production, and for the printing and converting of packaging materials.

See also 

List of Italian companies

Notes

External links
 
 ‘Officine meccaniche Giovanni Cerutti’, ACIGMA (Associazione Costruttori Italiani Macchine per l'industria Grafica, Cartotecnica, Cartaria, di Trasformazione e Affini / Italian Manufacturers Association of Machinery for the Graphic, Converting and Paper Industry).

Industrial machine manufacturers
Engineering companies of Italy
Casale Monferrato
Companies based in Piedmont
Manufacturing companies established in 1920
1920 establishments in Italy
Italian brands